Mirdi Limani (born July 8, 1975) is an Albanian former kickboxer who competed in the welterweight division. He went undefeated in his career, holding four world titles.

Career
Limani, an Albanian Macedonian, emigrated to Germany and won the WKA German Championship in 1997. He then became the WKA's title holder at the European and intercontinental level before beating Chakuriki Gym fighter Rachid el Haddad for the world title on June 6, 2001, in Fulda, Germany.

He would then also win world titles under the lightly-regarded WTKL and WMAO organizations in 2003 and 2004, respectively.

He became a four-time world champion on October 14, 2006 when he defeated Fernado Calleros of the United States on points to take the ISKA World Welterweight (66.8 kg/147 lb) Freestyle Championship in Frankfurt, Germany.

Championships and awards

Kickboxing
International Sport Karate Association
ISKA World Welterweight (66.8 kg/147 lb) Freestyle Championship
World Kickboxing Association
WKA German Championship
WKA Interim German Championship
WKA European Championship
WKA Intercontinental Championship
WKA World Championship
World Martial Arts Organization
WMAO World 67 kg/147 lb Championship
World Thai Kickboxing League
WTKL World Championship

Kickboxing record

|-
|-  bgcolor="CCFFCC"
| 2006-10-14 || Win ||align=left| Fernando Calleros || || Frankfurt, Germany || Decision || 5 || 3:00
|-
! style=background:white colspan=9 |
|-
|-  bgcolor="CCFFCC"
| 2004-11-20 || Win ||align=left| Baker Barakat || || Hanau, Germany || Decision || 5 || 3:00
|-
! style=background:white colspan=9 |
|-
|-  bgcolor="CCFFCC"
| 2002-11-30 || Win ||align=left| Hanas Grish || || Hanau, Germany || TKO (corner stoppage) || || 
|-
! style=background:white colspan=9 |
|-
|-  bgcolor="CCFFCC"
| 2002-07-27 || Win ||align=left| Michael Hansgut || || Tetovo, Macedonia || TKO (retirement) || || 
|-
! style=background:white colspan=9 |
|-
|-  bgcolor="CCFFCC"
| 2001-06-16 || Win ||align=left| Rachid el Haddad || || Fulda, Germany || Decision || 5 || 3:00
|-
! style=background:white colspan=9 |
|-
|-
| colspan=9 | Legend:

External links

References

1975 births
Living people
Albanian male kickboxers
German male kickboxers
Welterweight kickboxers
German people of Albanian descent
German people of Macedonian descent
Albanians in North Macedonia
Macedonian emigrants to Germany
Sportspeople from Frankfurt
Sportspeople from Struga